The Harlem Globetrotters Popcorn Machine was a Saturday morning variety show featuring players from the basketball team the Harlem Globetrotters singing, dancing, and performing comedy sketches. Broadcast from 1974 to 1975, it was produced by Funhouse Productions for Viacom Productions.

Cast
The Harlem Globetrotters:  
Meadowlark Lemon
Marques Haynes
Charles "Tex" Harrison
Hubert "Geese" Ausbie
Nate Branch
Curly Neal
Theodis "Wolfman" Lee
John Smith
Bobby Joe Mason
Avery Schreiber as Mr. Evil
Rodney Allen Rippy as himself
John Aylesworth - announcer

References

External links

Cultural depictions of the Harlem Globetrotters
Television series by CBS Studios
1974 American television series debuts
1975 American television series endings
1970s American children's comedy television series
1970s American variety television series
CBS original programming
English-language television shows